Hallam Leonard Movius (November 28, 1907 – May 30, 1987) was an American archaeologist most famous for his work on the Palaeolithic period.

Career

He was born in Newton, Massachusetts and attended Harvard College, graduating in 1930.  After receiving his PhD from Harvard and serving in the 12th Air Force in North Africa and Italy during World War II, he returned to Harvard and became a professor of archaeology there. Eventually he also became curator of Paleolithic Archaeology at Harvard's Peabody Museum of Archaeology and Ethnology.

In 1948 he proposed the existence of a Movius Line dividing the Acheulean tool users of Europe,  Africa and western Asia from the chopping tool industries of East Asia.

He also studied the Perigordian and Aurignacian cultures of Palaeolithic France, excavating at the rock shelter of Abri Pataud in Les Eyzies (Dordogne) from 1958 to 1973.

He married Nancy Champion de Crespigny (1910-2003), daughter of the Australian physician Sir Trent Champion de Crespigny on 25 September 1936. The American poet Geoffrey Movius (born 21 January 1940) was a son.

See also
Movius Line
Abri Pataud
Les Eyzies-de-Tayac-Sireuil

External links

Bibliography
Scarre, C (ed), The Human Past, Thames and Hudson, London, 2005

References

1907 births
1987 deaths
Harvard University faculty
United States Army Air Forces personnel of World War II
Harvard University alumni
20th-century American archaeologists